Soletta may refer to:

the Italian name for the Swiss city of Solothurn
the 1956 Soletta 750 concept minicar
a hypothetical magnifying device constructed in space for the purpose of amplifying the solar radiation a planet receives, in order to generate power or aid in the process of Terraforming.  Also see Solar mirror.

als:Solothurn (Begriffsklärung)